Pavel Giroud (born 1973) is a Cuban film director based in Madrid, Spain.

Career

Giroud studied design and graduated from the Instituto Superior de Diseño (High Institute of Design) in 1994.

He worked for a short period of time as a designer and art director in films and theatre plays. He then began to paint, working with the basic techniques and incorporating video into his work, before directing his first short films, featuring his friends rather than professional actors. From then, Giroud decided to focus his career on cinema.

Giroud filmed only self-written scripts, until he read the script for the movie La Edad de la peseta, written by young screenwriter Arturo Infante. According to Giroud, he did not originally see any possibility in the script to express himself as a director, but he gradually fell in love with it, adding: "Now, I tell Arturo that it's my film not his, and that he should forget he wrote it." He finished La Edad de la peseta in 2006. One film critic who saw the movie described Giroud as the "new Cuban Truffaut" and "the finest director of his generation". In 2020 the film was selected by Cuban Cinematheque as one of ten Best Cinematography and Best Production Design in 60 years of Cuban Cinema.

One year later he directed a noir film entitled Omerta, and began writing a more ambitious project, The Companion, which took more than six years to develop and secure financial support. The film was selected as the Cuban entry for the Best Foreign Language Film at the 89th Academy Awards. While developing this film, he co-directed Playing Lecuona, a musical documentary film about Cuban musician Ernesto Lecuona, starring the jazz pianists Michel Camilo, Chucho Valdés and Gonzalo Rubalcaba.

From 2012 to 2019 he collaborated with the fine arts group Los Carpinteros, directing all of their films except one. After this group disbanded, Giroud continued working with one of it members, Dagoberto Rodríguez, directing three experimental videos: "Geometría Popular", released online by Sabrina Amrani Gallery in March 2020, "Semillas", with music by Joan Valent, and "A palo Limpio".

In 2022, his documentary film, The Padilla affair, where he rescues the self-confession of the poet Heberto Padilla, a historic event hidden for more than half a century, is released at the Telluride Film Festival, and later presented at San Sebastián, Rome and other festivals.

Filmography
 2022 El Caso Padilla - Documentary Film.
 2021 A palo Limpio - Short Film. Collaboration with artist Dagoberto Rodríguez.
 2020 Semillas - Short Film. Collaboration with artist Dagoberto Rodríguez.
 2020 Geometría Popular - Short Film. Collaboration with artist Dagoberto Rodríguez.
 2019 Retráctil - Short Film. Collaboration with Los Carpinteros.
 2016 El Acompañante (The Companion) - Feature film.
 2015 Playing Lecuona - Documentary film.
 2014 Polaris - Short film - Collaboration with Los Carpinteros.
 2013 Pellejo - Short film  - Collaboration with Los Carpinteros.
 2012 Conga Irreversible - Collaboration with Los Carpinteros.
 2008 Omertá - Feature Film.
 2007 Manteca, Mondongo y Bacalao con pan - Documentary Film.
 2006 La Edad de la peseta (The Silly Age) - Feature Film
 2005 Frank Emilio, Amor y Piano - EPK
 2005 Esther Borja: Rapsodia de Cuba - Documentary Film
 2004 Tres Veces Dos - (Flash: One of three sections of the film) - Feature Film
 2002 Todo por Ella - Short Film
 2000 Manzanita.com - Short Film
 1998 Rrring° - Short Film

Main awards

 Tres Veces Dos
 Selected by critics as one of the 10 most significant films in Cuba in 2004
 Montreal 2004: Zenith de Plata as best first film.
 Golden Precolumbian Circle: nominated for best film
 III Muestra de Nuevos Realizadores: best work of fiction, Asoc. Críticos Cinematográficos Prize, EICTV Prize
 ICARO 2004, Guatemala: best foreign film
 Unión Nacional de Escritores y Artistas de Cuba (UNEAC) caracol Prize: best art direction, music, editing, photography
 XXVI Festival Int. del Nuevo Cine Latinoamericano: Federación Nac. de Cineclubs Prize, UPEC Prize

 La Edad de la peseta (The Silly Age)
 Nominated. Spanish Academy Goya Award. 
 World Premiere. Toronto International Film Festival: 
 Best Cinematography, Best Art Direction, Foreign Press Glauber Rocha Award, UNEAC Award, Latin New Cinema Found Prize. Havana International Film Festival: 
 Chris Holter Audience Prize. San Francisco International Film Festival
 Best Hispanoamerican film. Santa Barbara International Film Festival
 Best film. India Catalina Award. Cartagena Film Festival
 Best Director, Original Score, Art Direction. Cine Ceará, Brasil
 Best Film. Cinesul, Rio de Janeiro.
  2nd Audience Award. Festival de Lima
  Special Jury Prize / Best Actress (Mercedes Sampietro). Muestra de Cine de Santo Domingo.
 Best Script / Best Actor (Iván Carreira). Mérida 2007: 
 Audience Award. Cero Latitud, Ecuador: 
 Best Film, Direction, Cinematography, Editing, Original Score, Costume Design, Make-up and Hairdressing. Artist & Writers Cuban Union Award: 
 Cuba Entry for Academy Award for Best Foreign Language Film, Oscars 2007
 Official selection. Mar del Plata 2007, Washington 2007, Munich 2007: 
 Selected by critics as the Best Cuban Film of 2006.

 Omertá
 Best Screenplay. Havana International Film Festival:
 Vigía Award. Havana International Film Festival:
 World Premiere. San Sebastian International Film Festival

 Playing Lecuona
 Best Documentary Film. Montreal World Film Festival
 Merit Award. New York International Film Festival.
 Best Documentary Film. Cubadisco Award.

 El Acompañante (The Companion)
 Nominated. Best Screenplay. Premios Platino. 
 Audience Award. Miami International Film Festival.
 Audience Award. Toulouse
 ACC Award. Toulouse
 Audience Award. Málaga Spanish Film Festival
 Best Screenplay. Havana Film Festival New York
 Second Audience Award. Havana International Film Festival:
 Best Screenplay / Best Actor / Best Actress. New York Latin ACE Awards
 Best Screenplay. SGAE Julio Alejandro Award.
 Best Project. San Sebastian International Film Festival. Co-Production Forum.
 Main Caracol Award and Best Film, Direction, Cinematography, Production, Screenplay. Artist & Writers Cuban Union Award: 
 World Premiere. Busan International Film Festival.
 U.S. Premiere. Chicago International Film Festival.
 Cuba Entry for Academy Award for Best Foreign Language Film, Oscars 2017
 Selected by critics as one of the 10 most significant worldwide films released in Cuba in 2016.
 Nominated. Forqué Awards. EGEDA.

Trivia

He has been a coach for actresses  Penélope Cruz and Adria Arjona.

Pavel is a third cousin of the Cuban writer Dulce María Loynaz.

References

External links
 

1973 births
Living people
Cuban contemporary artists
Cuban film directors